The Certificate in Education (Cert Ed) is a professional qualification for teachers in the United Kingdom. There have been two incarnations of the Cert Ed over the years.

New Cert Ed
The current Cert Ed is a non-compulsory qualification offering training in teaching at further or higher education level.

Those wanting to teach at primary or secondary education must undertake either a Bachelor of Education or a Bachelor of Arts degree, such as a BA (Hons) Primary Education, or Bachelor of Science (in a relevant Education course) degree or a non-education degree followed by a postgraduate qualification in teaching, such as the PGCE.

In 2007, many colleges and Universities stopped teaching the Cert Ed with the advent of the newer Teaching Awards, the Diploma in Teaching in the Lifelong Learning Sector (DTLLS) replacing the full Cert Ed.

Old Cert Ed
The old Cert Ed was a qualification that was required to become teachers. The Cert Ed course took three years to complete and was studied for at a College of Education under the control of the local or nearest university. The Cert Ed was discontinued in the early 1980s when the law required all trainee teachers to train via graduate or post-graduate courses. The Cert Ed did allow some students that reached the qualifying level to complete a fourth year for a BEd (Hons) degree.

See also
 Bachelor of Education
 Diploma of Education
 Certificate (disambiguation)
 Postgraduate Diploma in Education
 Professional Graduate Diploma in Education

Educational qualifications in the United Kingdom
Professional titles and certifications